Mark Knowles and Max Mirnyi were the defending champions but they competed with different partners that year, Knowles with Daniel Nestor and Mirnyi with Yevgeny Kafelnikov.

Kafelnikov and Mirnyi lost in the quarterfinals to Juan Balcells and Andrei Olhovskiy.

Knowles and Nestor won in the final 6–3, 6–1 against Balcells and Olhovskiy.

Seeds

  Yevgeny Kafelnikov /  Max Mirnyi (quarterfinals)
  Mark Knowles /  Daniel Nestor (champions)
  David Prinosil /  Nenad Zimonjić (quarterfinals)
  Simon Aspelin /  Cyril Suk (quarterfinals)

Draw

Qualifying

Seeds

  Nicolas Coutelot /  Andy Fahlke (first round)
  Igor Kunitcin /  Uros Vico (first round)

Qualifiers
  Jean-François Bachelot /  Dick Norman

Draw

References
 2001 Qatar Open Doubles Draw
 2001 Qatar Open Doubles Qualifying Draw

2001 Qatar Open
Doubles
Qatar Open (tennis)